Plum Village may refer to:
 Plum Village Tradition, a school of Buddhism.
 Plum Village Monastery, a Buddhist monastery of the Plum Village Tradition in southern France.
 Plum Village Community of Engaged Buddhism, the governance body of the monasteries, press and fundraising organizations established by Zen Buddhist monk Thich Nhat Hanh.